Eggebek is a municipality in the district of Schleswig-Flensburg, in Schleswig-Holstein, Germany. It is situated approximately 17 km northwest of Schleswig, and 18 km south of Flensburg.

Eggebek is the seat of the Amt ("collective municipality") Eggebek.

References

Schleswig-Flensburg